To the Abandoned Sacred Beasts is an anime series adapted from the manga of the same title by Maybe. The series is directed by Jun Shishido at MAPPA, with Shigeru Murakoshi written the scripts, Daisuke Niinuma designed the characters, and Yoshihiro Ike composed the music. It aired from 1 July to 16 September 2019 on Tokyo MX, BS11, and MBS. Crunchyroll streamed the series and it ran for 12 episodes.


Episode List

Notes

References

To the Abandoned Sacred Beasts